William Crofts was one of the two MPs for Bury St Edmunds between 1685 and 1689.

References

Crofts